Abraxas celidota is a nocturnal species of moth belonging to the family Geometridae. It was described by Wehrli in 1931. It is known from western China.

References

Abraxini
Moths of Asia
Moths described in 1931
Nocturnal animals